Futagoryu Isao (born 16 November 1941 as Isao Omura) is a former sumo wrestler from Aomori, Japan. He made his professional debut in September 1960 and reached the top division in January 1969. His highest rank was maegashira 5. He retired in March 1971.

Career record

See also
Glossary of sumo terms
List of past sumo wrestlers

References

1941 births
Living people
Japanese sumo wrestlers
Sumo people from Aomori Prefecture